The following page lists power stations in United Arab Emirates.

Legend

Fossil fuel

Gas turbines

Oil and gas-fired thermal plant 
To be converted to combined-cycle gas turbine technology to enhance efficiency and reduce emissions.

Nuclear

Renewable

Solar photovoltaic

Storage 
Pumped hydroelectric

See also 

List of power stations in Asia

References 

United Arab Emirates
Power stations